Mark Malyar (born 5 March 2000) is an Israeli para swimmer.

Career
Malyar competed in his first Paralympic games, representing Israel at the 2020 Summer Paralympics, where he won the gold medals in the 200 metre individual medley SM7 and the 400 m freestyle S7, setting new world records in both, and the bronze medal in the 100 m backstroke S7.

His parents are Alex and Diana. He has an identical twin brother named Ariel Malyer, who is a paralympic swimmer as well.

References

External links
 
 

2000 births
Living people
Paralympic gold medalists for Israel
Paralympic bronze medalists for Israel
Paralympic swimmers of Israel
Israeli male swimmers
Israeli male freestyle swimmers
Swimmers at the 2020 Summer Paralympics
Medalists at the 2020 Summer Paralympics
Medalists at the World Para Swimming Championships
S7-classified Paralympic swimmers
Paralympic medalists in swimming